Cape May County Technical High School, located in Middle Township, which provides vocational and technical education to students in ninth through twelfth grades from Cape May County, New Jersey, United States, operating as part of the Cape May County Technical School District. The school has been accredited by the Middle States Association of Colleges and Schools Commission on Elementary and Secondary Schools since 2000.

It has a Cape May Court House postal address but is not located in the census-designated place.

As of the 2021–22 school year, the school had an enrollment of 535 students and 65.0 classroom teachers (on an FTE basis), for a student–teacher ratio of 8.2:1. There were 105 students (19.6% of enrollment) eligible for free lunch and 17 (3.2% of students) eligible for reduced-cost lunch.

Awards, recognition and rankings
Schooldigger.com ranked the school 126th out of 381 public high schools statewide in its 2011 rankings (a decrease of 39 positions from the 2010 ranking) which were based on the combined percentage of students classified as proficient or above proficient on the mathematics (81.6%) and language arts literacy (98.6%) components of the High School Proficiency Assessment (HSPA).

Athletics
The Cape May Technical High School Hawks compete in the National Division of the Cape-Atlantic League, an athletic conference that operates under the aegis of the New Jersey State Interscholastic Athletic Association (NJSIAA) and which is comprised of public and private high schools in Atlantic, Cape May, Cumberland, and Gloucester counties. With 476 students in grades 10-12, the school was classified by the NJSIAA for the 2019–20 school year as Group I for most athletic competition purposes, which included schools with an enrollment of 75 to 476 students in that grade range.

Administration
The school's principal is Steven Vitiello. His core administration team includes the assistant principal and athletic director.

References

Further reading

External links

Cape May County Technical High School

School Data for the Cape May County Technical School District, National Center for Education Statistics
South Jersey Sports: Cape May Tech HS

1991 establishments in New Jersey
Educational institutions established in 1991
Middle Township, New Jersey
Public high schools in Cape May County, New Jersey
Vocational schools in New Jersey